Louis-Jacques Durameau (Paris, 5 October 1733- Versailles, 3 September 1796) was a French painter.

Life
A son of Jacques Durameau (master printer in intaglio) and Marie Rocou (or Rocan), he was intended for an engraver by his father and trained in drawing at the studio of the sculptor Jean-Baptiste Defernex. He then entered the studio of Jean-Baptiste Marie Pierre. In 1757, he won the Grand prix de Rome, with the subject Élie ressuscite le fils de la Sunamite. He died at the age of 62 of a pulmonary congestion after a trip to Paris on foot.

References

 Marc Sandoz, Louis-Jacques Durameau, 1733-1796, Éditart - Quatre Chemins, Paris, 1980
 Anne Leclair, Louis-Jacques Durameau, 1733-1796, Arthéna, Paris, 2001, 
 Anne Leclair, "Louis-Jacques Durameau et l'art de son temps", in  L'Objet d'Art, p. 383, September 2003

1733 births
1796 deaths
18th-century French painters
French male painters
18th-century French male artists